John DeWolf (June 7, 1817 – September 7, 1895) was a member of the Wisconsin State Assembly.

Biography
DeWolf was born on June 7, 1817. In 1838, he married Susan Emeline. They had two children and moved to Darien, Wisconsin from Otsego County, New York in 1854. DeWolf died on September 7, 1895.

Career
DeWolf was a member of the Assembly in 1860. Additionally, he was a Walworth County, Wisconsin Supervisor. He was a Republican.

References

People from Otsego County, New York
People from Darien, Wisconsin
Republican Party members of the Wisconsin State Assembly
County supervisors in Wisconsin
1817 births
1895 deaths
19th-century American politicians